Jan Paweł Bednarek (born 10 August 1955) is a Polish politician. He was elected to the Sejm on 25 September 2005, getting 1102 votes in 40 Koszalin constituency as a candidate from the Self-Defence of the Republic of Poland list.

See also
Members of Polish Sejm 2005-2007

External links
Jan Bednarek - parliamentary page - includes declarations of interest, voting record, and transcripts of speeches.

Members of the Polish Sejm 2005–2007
Self-Defence of the Republic of Poland politicians
1955 births
Living people
People from Słupsk County